The Alameda Journal is an American weekly paid newspaper which serves the city of Oakland and surrounding Alameda County, California. The Alameda Journal is now published under the name East Bay Times.

It is published weekly on Friday with an estimated circulation is 23,259.

It is edited by Jon Kawamoto, and is owned by Digital First Media as part of their Bay Area News Group.

History 

The Alameda Journal was founded in 1987 by John Crittenden. Hills Newspapers later purchased the paper as part of its east bay dailies and weeklies, which included

In 1998, it was purchased by Knight Ridder and Contra Costa Newspapers as part of a larger deal to buy Hills Newspapers. The News Media Group purchased the papers in 2006 but later declared bankruptcy in 2010, selling the papers to a hedge fund. Digital First Media acquired the papers in 2010.

In 2014, the Alameda Journal ceased free delivery of the paper, requiring those wishing for delivery to subscribe to the Oakland Tribune. The effort was part of a strategy to drive more people to its website. In 2016, the Bay Area News Group consolidated its local papers under two names, The Mercury News and East Bay Times. Alameda Journal was subsumed under the East Bay Times name, becoming a section published on Fridays.

References 

Newspapers established in 1987
Mass media in Alameda County, California
Alameda County, California
Newspapers published in the San Francisco Bay Area
Digital First Media
Weekly newspapers published in California